Pavel Novitsky or Pavel Novitskiy may refer to:

Pavel Novitsky (admiral) (1857–1917), Russian admiral
Pavel Novitsky (photographer) (1888–1971), Russian/Soviet photographer 
Pavel Novitskiy (b. 1989), Russian soccer player